Al-Suwar (also spelled as-Suwar or al-Suwwar) is a town in eastern Syria, administratively part of the Deir ez-Zor Governorate, located along the Khabur river, north-east of Deir ez-Zor. In 2004, there were 5297 inhabitants.

History
In the past, most scholars identified al-Suwar with Suru (Su-ú-ru), the capital city of Aramean state Bit-Halupe at the time of Tukulti-Ninurta II; however, Suru is now generally identified with nearby Tell Fiden instead. Edward Lipinski instead identified al-Suwar with the town of *Ṣūriḫ or *Ṣuwariḫ (Ṣú-ú-ri-iḫ), the first town mentioned  by the king Adad-nirari II in the province of Laqe on the Khabur river.

Civil war
During the Syrian Civil War, the town fell under ISIL occupation until it was liberated by U.S.-backed Syrian Democratic Forces during an offensive in September 2017.

References

Populated places in Deir ez-Zor District
Towns in Syria